Beaugrand Township is a civil township of Cheboygan County in the U.S. state of Michigan. As of the 2010 census, the township population was 1,168. The area was settled in 1852.

Geography
The township is located in northwestern Cheboygan County, bordered to the northeast by the South Channel of the Straits of Mackinac and to the southeast by the city of Cheboygan, the county seat. The township includes the unincorporated communities of Pries Landing, Point Nipigon, and Grand View, all along the shore of the South Channel. U.S. Route 23 follows the shoreline, leading southeast into Cheboygan and northwest to Mackinaw City.

Demographics
As of the census of 2000, there were 1,157 people, 484 households, and 351 families residing in the township. The racial makeup of the township was 93.78% White, 0.17% African American, 2.25% Native American, 0.09% Asian, 0.09% from other races, and 3.63% from two or more races. Hispanic or Latino of any race were 0.52% of the population.

There were 484 households, out of which 28.9% had children under the age of 18 living with them, 60.7% were married couples living together, 8.3% had a female householder with no husband present, and 27.3% were non-families. 22.9% of all households were made up of individuals, and 11.2% had someone living alone who was 65 years of age or older.  The average household size was 2.39 and the average family size was 2.79.

In the township the population was spread out, with 23.1% under the age of 18, 6.0% from 18 to 24, 24.4% from 25 to 44, 29.0% from 45 to 64, and 17.6% who were 65 years of age or older.  The median age was 43 years. For every 100 females, there were 93.8 males.  For every 100 females age 18 and over, there were 93.5 males.

The median income for a household in the township was $34,792, and the median income for a family was $39,779. Males had a median income of $30,417 versus $20,625 for females. The per capita income for the township was $20,244.  About 6.5% of families and 9.5% of the population were below the poverty line, including 13.0% of those under age 18 and 4.3% of those age 65 or over.

References

External links
Beaugrand Township official website

Townships in Cheboygan County, Michigan
1852 establishments in Michigan
Populated places established in 1852
Townships in Michigan
Populated places on Lake Huron in the United States